Carex egglestonii, or Eggleston's sedge, is a species of sedge that was first described by Kenneth Mackenzie in 1915.

References

egglestonii
Plants described in 1915